C/2007 E2 (Lovejoy) is a non-periodic comet discovered by Terry Lovejoy on 15 March 2007. Its perihelion was 27 March 2007, while its closest approach to Earth was 25 April 2007 in Hercules at a distance of 0.44 AU. Maximum apparent magnitude was approximately +8.

The discovery was made using a Canon EOS 350D consumer grade digital camera, and not a CCD survey camera.

Image gallery

References

External links 

C/2007 E2 at the JPL Small-Body Database Browser
C/2007 E2 at Cometography.com
C/2007 E2 moving amongst the stars (video in WMV format)

20070315
20070327
2007E02
20070425